Dovodchikovo is a rural locality (a village) in Spasskoye Rural Settlement, Vologodsky District, Vologda Oblast, Russia. The population was 7 as of 2002.

Geography 
Dovodchikovo is located 49 km southwest of Vologda (the district's administrative centre) by road. Norobovo is the nearest rural locality.

References 

Rural localities in Vologodsky District
Vologodsky Uyezd